Beloit High School may refer to:

Beloit Junior-Senior High School, a public high school in Beloit, Kansas, United States
Beloit Memorial High School, a public high school in Beloit, Wisconsin, United States